Taurolithocholic acid is a bile acid.

See also
 Tauroursodeoxycholic acid

Bile acids
Cholanes
Sulfonic acids